This is a list of electoral divisions and wards in the ceremonial county of Hertfordshire in the East of England. All changes since the re-organisation of local government following the passing of the Local Government Act 1972 are shown. The number of councillors elected for each electoral division or ward is shown in brackets.

County council

Hertfordshire
Electoral Divisions from 1 April 1974 (first election 12 April 1973) to 7 May 1981:

Electoral Divisions from 7 May 1981 to 7 June 2001:

Electoral Divisions from 7 June 2001 to 4 May 2017:

† minor boundary changes in 2009

Electoral Divisions from 4 May 2017 to present:

District councils

Broxbourne
Wards from 1 April 1974 (first election 7 June 1973) to 6 May 1976:

Wards from 6 May 1976 to 6 May 1999:

Wards from 6 May 1999 to 3 May 2012:

Wards from 3 May 2012 to present:

Dacorum
Wards from 1 April 1974 (first election 7 June 1973) to 3 May 1979:

Wards from 3 May 1979 to 6 May 1999:

Wards from 6 May 1999 to 3 May 2007:

Wards from 3 May 2007 to present:

East Hertfordshire
Wards from 1 April 1974 (first election 7 June 1973) to 3 May 1979:

Wards from 3 May 1979 to 6 May 1999:

Wards from 6 May 1999 to present:

Hertsmere
Wards from 1 April 1974 (first election 7 June 1973) to 6 May 1976:

Wards from 6 May 1976 to 6 May 1999:

Wards from 6 May 1999 to 2 May 2019:

Wards from 2 May 2019 to present:

North Hertfordshire
Wards from 1 April 1974 (first election 7 June 1973) to 3 May 1979:

Wards from 3 May 1979 to 6 May 1999:

Wards from 6 May 1999 to 3 May 2007:

Wards from 3 May 2007 to present:

St Albans
Wards from 1 April 1974 (first election 7 June 1973) to 3 May 1979:

Wards from 3 May 1979 to 6 May 1999:

Wards from 6 May 1999 to 5 May 2022:

† minor boundary changes in 2007

Wards from 5 May 2022:

Stevenage
Wards from 1 April 1974 (first election 7 June 1973) to 6 May 1976:

Wards from 6 May 1976 to 3 May 1979:

Wards from 3 May 1979 to 6 May 1999:

Wards from 6 May 1999 to present:

Three Rivers
Wards from 1 April 1974 (first election 7 June 1973) to 6 May 1976:

Wards from 6 May 1976 to 6 May 1999:

Wards from 6 May 1999 to 22 May 2014:

Wards from 22 May 2014 to present:

Watford
Wards from 1 April 1974 (first election 7 June 1973) to 6 May 1976:

Wards from 6 May 1976 to 6 May 1999:

Wards from 6 May 1999 to 5 May 2016:

Wards from 5 May 2016 to present:

Welwyn Hatfield
Wards from 1 April 1974 (first election 7 June 1973) to 6 May 1976:

Wards from 6 May 1976 to 2 May 1991:

Wards from 2 May 1991 to 6 May 1999:

Wards from 6 May 1999 to 1 May 2008:

Wards from 1 May 2008 to 5 May 2016:

Wards from 5 May 2016 to present:

Electoral wards by constituency

Broxbourne
Broxbourne, Bury Green, Cheshunt Central, Cheshunt North, Flamstead End, Goffs Oak, Hoddesdon North, Hoddesdon Town, Northaw, Rosedale, Rye Park, Theobalds, Waltham Cross, Wormley & Turnford.

Hemel Hempstead
Adeyfield East, Adeyfield West, Apsley, Ashridge, Bennetts End, Boxmoor, Chaulden & Shrubhill, Corner Hall, Gadebridge, Grove Hill, Hemel Hempstead Central, Highfield & St Pauls, Kings Langley, Leverstock Green, Nash Mills, Warners End, Watling, Woodhall.

Hertford and Stortford
Bishop's Stortford All Saints, Bishop's Stortford Central, Bishop's Stortford Meads, Bishop's Stortford Silverleys,
Bishop's Stortford South, Great Amwell, Hertford Bengeo, Hertford Castle, Hertford Heath, Hertford Kingsmead, Hertford Sele, Hunsdon, Much Hadham, Sawbridgeworth, Stanstead Abbots, Ware Chadwell, Ware Christchurch, Ware St Mary's, Ware Trinity.

Hertsmere
Aldenham East, Aldenham West, Borehamwood Brookmeadow, Borehamwood Cowley Hill, Borehamwood Hillside, Borehamwood Kenilworth, Bushey Heath, Bushey North, Bushey Park, Bushey St James, Elstree, Potters Bar Furzefield, Potters Bar Oakmere, Potters Bar Parkfield, Shenley.

Hitchin and Harpenden
Cadwell, Graveley & Wymondley, Harpenden East, Harpenden North, Harpenden South, Harpenden West, Hitchin Bearton, Hitchin Highbury, Hitchin Oughton, Hitchin Priory, Hitchin Walsworth, Hitchwood, Hoo, Kimpton, Offa, Redbourn, Sandridge, Wheathampstead.

North East Hertfordshire
Arbury, Baldock East, Baldock Town, Braughing, Buntingford, Hertford Rural North, Hertford Rural South, Ermine, Letchworth East, Letchworth Grange, Letchworth South East, Letchworth South West, Letchworth Wilbury, Little Hadham, Mundens and Cottered, Puckeridge, Royston Heath, Royston Meridian,
Royston Palace, Thundridge & Standon, Walkern, Watton-at-Stone, Weston and Sandon.

South West Hertfordshire
Aldbury and Wigginton, Ashridge, Berkhamsted Castle, Berkhamsted East, Berkhamsted West, Bovingdon, Chorleywood East, Chorleywood West, Croxley Green, Croxley Green North, Croxley Green South, Flaunden & Chipperfield, Hayling, Maple Cross & Mill End, Moor Park & Eastbury, Northchurch, Northwick, Penn, Rickmansworth, Rickmansworth West, Sarratt, Tring Central, Tring East, Tring West.

St Albans
Ashley, Batchwood, Bedmond & Primrose Hill, Clarence, Colney Heath, Cunningham, London Colney, Marshalswick North, Marshalswick South, Park Street, St Peters, St Stephen, Sopwell, Verulam.

Stevenage
Bandley Hill, Bedwell, Chells, Codicote, Datchworth and Aston, Knebworth, Longmeadow, Manor, Martins Wood, Old Town, Pin Green, Roebuck, St Nicholas, Shephall, Symonds Green, Woodfield.

Watford
Abbots Langley, Callowland, Carpenders Park, Central, Holywell, Langleybury, Leavesden, Leggatts, Meriden, Nascot, Oxhey, Oxhey Hall, Park, Stanborough, Tudor, Vicarage, Woodside.

Welwyn Hatfield
Brookmans Park and Little Heath, Haldens, Handside, Hatfield Central, Hatfield East, Hatfield North, Hatfield South, Hatfield Villages, Hollybush, Howlands, Panshanger, Peartree, Sherrards, Welham Green, Welwyn North, Welwyn South.

See also
List of parliamentary constituencies in Hertfordshire

References

 
Hertfordshire